Proceedings of the American Mathematical Society is a monthly peer-reviewed scientific journal of mathematics published by the American Mathematical Society.   As a requirement, all articles must be at most 15 printed pages.

According to the Journal Citation Reports, the journal has a 2018 impact factor of 0.813.

Scope

Proceedings of the American Mathematical Society publishes articles from all areas of pure and applied mathematics, including topology, geometry, analysis, algebra, number theory, combinatorics, logic, probability and statistics.

Abstracting and indexing
This journal is indexed in the following databases:
Mathematical Reviews 
Zentralblatt MATH 
Science Citation Index 
Science Citation Index Expanded 
ISI Alerting Services 
CompuMath Citation Index 
Current Contents / Physical, Chemical & Earth Sciences.

Other journals from the American Mathematical Society 
 Bulletin of the American Mathematical Society
 Memoirs of the American Mathematical Society
 Notices of the American Mathematical Society
Journal of the American Mathematical Society
 Transactions of the American Mathematical Society

References

External links
 
 Proceedings of the American Mathematical Society on JSTOR

American Mathematical Society academic journals
Mathematics journals
Monthly journals
Publications established in 1950
1950 establishments in the United States